Anthony Christian Meo (born 4 October 1959) is a retired English snooker player. He won the 1989 British Open by defeating Dean Reynolds 13–6 in the final, and was runner-up to Steve Davis at the 1984 Classic. He won four World Doubles Championship titles, partnering Davis, and the 1983 World Team Classic representing England alongside Davis and Tony Knowles.

He played snooker together with his schoolfriend Jimmy White as a teenager. Aged seventeen, Meo became the then-youngest person known to have made an unofficial maximum break of 147. He won the British under-19 title in 1978, as well as other junior titles. He turned professional in 1979, and won the 1981 Australian Masters, 1983 Thailand Masters and 1985 Australian Masters. He took the 1986 English Professional Championship title, and retained it in 1987. He made a break of 147 in his 1988 Matchroom League match against Stephen Hendry, and won the 1990 International League.

He retired from professional play after the 1996–97 snooker season and became a wrist watch consultant.  In 1986, Meo was one of five players under Barry Hearn's management (along with Davis, Terry Griffiths, Willie Thorne and Dennis Taylor) who appeared on "Snooker Loopy", a hit single about the game recorded with Chas & Dave.

Early life
Anthony Christian Meo was born on 4 October 1959 in Tooting, London, and started playing snooker aged 13. He was a schoolfriend of Jimmy White at Ernest Bevin Comprehensive, and the pair regularly skipped school to play snooker together. When he was 15 (and White was 13), they were approached by "Dodgy" Bob Davis who arranged money matches for them and became their manager. The players later signed to be managed, alongside the leading London amateur Patsy Fagan, by Henry West. At 17, Meo became the then-youngest person known to have made an unofficial maximum break of 147.

Amateur career
Meo defeated White in the final to win the 1977 Pontins Junior title as well as taking the Warners Pro-Am title by winning against professional Doug Mountjoy 5–4 in the final. Meo took the British under-19 title in 1978 with a 3–1 victory against defending champion Ian Williamson in the final. At the 1978 Canadian Open, he achieved the most notable win of his career to that point by eliminating Alex Higgins in the semi-final, and led 10–6 in the final against Cliff Thorburn before losing the match 15–17. He won a second Warners Open title in 1979, 5–2 against White in the final.

Professional career
Meo turned professional in June 1979. At the 1979 Canadian Open he was seeded into the last 16, where he lost 7–9 to Jim Wych. He eliminated David Taylor from the 1979 UK Championship 9–7, and then lost to the eventual champion John Virgo 6–9 in the following round. He made his world championship debut at the 1980 World Snooker Championship, after progressing past Jimmy van Rensberg and Pat Houlihan (both 9–1) in qualifying.

At the 1980 UK Championship, Meo eliminated defending champion Virgo 9–1 before losing to Steve Davis in the quarter-finals. The 1981 English Professional Championship saw Meo eliminate Virgo, Graham Miles and Willie Thorne to reach the final. Meo finished as runner-up, losing 3–9 to Davis. Meo recorded his third win against Virgo in the season with a 10–6 win at the 1981 World Snooker Championship, making a break of 134 during the match. In the second round, Meo finished his first session with Terry Griffiths at 4–4, but only won two of the next eleven frames, with Griffiths taking the match 13–6.

At the start of the 1981–82 snooker season, Meo won the 1981 Australian Masters, a short-format competition that saw two groups each of four professional players play one-frame round-robin matches, with the group winners then playing the final over three frames. He lost 3–9 to Griffiths in the semi-finals at the 1981 UK Championship after eliminating both Higgins and Thorburn. Davis and Meo won the 1982 World Doubles Championship. Meo also reached the semi-finals of the 1982 Masters. The 1982 UK Championship was a repeat of 1981 in that he reached the semi-finals and lost to Griffiths, this time 7–9. He reached the World Championship quarter-finals for the first time at the 1983 tournament, and finished the season by winning the 1983 Pontins Brean Sands tournament, with a 9–7 final victory against Silvino Francisco.

In the 1983–84 snooker season, he won the 1983 Thailand Masters, and was a semi-finalist at the 1983 Professional Players Tournament. In December 1983, Davis and Meo retained the World Doubles Championship. The following month, they faced each other in the final of the Lada Classic. Meo had reached the final by eliminating Rex Williams 5–3, Kirk Stevens 5–2 and Mark Wildman 5–3. After losing the first two frames in the final, Meo established a 4–2 lead, which was reduced to 4–3 after Davis won the concluding frame of the first session with a 122 . In the second session, Davis took the first four frames, compiling six breaks of 35 or more. Meo claimed the next four frames, to require just one more frame at 8–7, having recovered from more than 40  behind in both the 12th and 15th frames. Davis built a lead of 38 points, but Meo recovered to 12 points behind with a break of 26. Davis went on to win the frame and match.

The non-ranking 1984 Malaysian Masters was the only final that Meo reached in 1984–85 snooker season, but he retained his ranking of tenth for 1985–86. He won the 1985 Australian Masters by defeating John Campbell 7–2 in the final, and the 1986 English Professional Championship. In the latter, he defeated Davis 9–7 in the semi-finals, his first victory over Davis in their eleven professional matches against each other. In the final, Meo led Neal Foulds 3–1, but the first session finished with the pair level at 3–3. Meo was a frame ahead at 4–3 and 5–4, with Foulds then taking the next two frames to lead for the first time in the match at 6–5. Meo added the 12th frame, but Foulds moved ahead again by claiming the 13th. Meo won the next three frames for a 9–7 victory, finishing with a break of 94 in the 16th frame.

The 1987 English Professional Championship saw him retain the title by defeating Les Dodd 9–5 in the final, but his ranking tournament performances in the 1986–87 snooker season meant he slipped from 11th to 20th place in the rankings, and his results in the following season saw him fall to 31st in the 1988/1989 rankings. He compiled a maximum break of 147 in his 1988 Matchroom League match against Stephen Hendry.

In the 1988–89 snooker season, he reached the quarter-finals of the 1988 International Open. At the 1989 British Open he eliminated Colin Roscoe 5–3, then the defending champion Hendry and Peter Francisco, each by the same scoreline. In the semi-final against Mike Hallett, Meo was two frames behind with three to play at 6–8. He won the 15th frame by a single point after requiring two , then added the next two frames to win 9–8. In the final, he played Dean Reynolds, and won each of the first two sessions 5–2, thus leading 10–4 by the third session. Reynolds reduced his deficit to 6–10, but Meo won the next three frames to claim victory at 13–6 and achieve his first ranking title victory. Before the tournament, he had been rated as a 200–1 outsider to win. In the post-match speeches, Reynolds complained that he had been "totally bored" by Meo's cautious style of play. Meo acknowledged that "It wasn't very spectacular" and added that he felt that it was "the best tactical snooker" that he had ever player.

Meo was a semi-finalist at the World Championship, losing 7–16 to John Parrott. His performances in ranking tournaments led to him moving up from 31st place to 14th in the rankings for the following season, during which he won the round-robin 1990 International League by winning four of his five matches, and drawing the other one. However, in the following years, he failed to reach as far as the quarter-finals in any ranking tournament, and his ranking fell one place to 15th, then out of the top 32. Meo was ranked 160th after the 1996–97 snooker season, but did not participate in any further tournaments in the following seasons. He became a wrist watch consultant.

In 1982, Meo signed up to be managed by Barry Hearn, Davis's manager.  With Davis, Meo won four World Doubles titles, and was also part of the victorious England team at the 1983 World Team Classic. In 1986, Meo was one of five players under Hearn's management (along with Davis, Griffiths, Thorne and Dennis Taylor) who appeared on "Snooker Loopy", a hit single about the game recorded with Chas & Dave. He was nicknamed "The Cat" and "Meo, Meo". The highest ranking that he attained was tenth.

Personal life
By 1981, Meo had married Denise, and in 1991 they had their fourth child. After retiring from snooker in 1997, Meo managed a wristwatch and jewellery store in Hatton Garden.

Performance and rankings timeline

Performance and rankings timeline notes

Career finals

Ranking finals: 2 (1 title)

Non-ranking finals: 10 (7 titles)

Team finals: 6 (5 titles)

Pro-am finals: 3 (2 titles)

Amateur finals: 2 (2 titles)

References

Bibliography

External links

1959 births
Living people
English snooker players
People from Tooting
Snooker players from London
People educated at Ernest Bevin College
English people of Italian descent